Dances With Films (DWF) is an annual independent film festival located in Los Angeles, California and was founded by Leslee Scallon and Michael Trent.

Lineup
Taking place every year since 1998, the festival is dedicated to representing true independent cinema stipulating that all films entered into the festival competition have no known directors, writers or producers connected to them. Programmes include a mix of feature-length films, shorts, documentaries and animations.

Notable artists
Dances With Films alumni include Steven Kane, Mark V. Olsen and Will Scheffer, Dan Harris, John Putch and Mike Flanagan.

References

External links 

Film festivals in Los Angeles
Film festivals established in 1998
1998 establishments in the United States